Canino is a surname. Notable people with the surname include:

Angel Canino (born 2003), Filipina volleyball player
Bonnie Canino (born 1962), American boxer
Bruno Canino (born 1935), Italian composer
Gaspare Canino (1900–1977), Italian artist

Italian-language surnames
Spanish-language surnames